Josephine Aumea Herman is a Cook Islands physician and public servant. Since June 2018 she has served as Secretary of Health in the Cook Islands government.

A physician with a research PhD, Herman studied medicine in Port Moresby in Papua New Guinea and at the University of Auckland. She is a volunteer with the organization DAISI, Doctors Assisting in South-Pacific Islands, and is vice-chair of Pacific Heads of Health. In her official capacity she has been responsible for coordinating the government's response to the 2019 outbreak of dengue fever on the islands. She has spoken of the need to preserve Cook Islands Māori. Herman is the aunt of current Cook Islands Secretary of Internal Affairs Anne Herman; the two were named to their department secretary roles at the same time by Prime Minister Henry Puna.

References

Year of birth missing (living people)
Living people
Cook Island medical doctors
21st-century women physicians
University of Auckland alumni